Salomäki is a surname. Notable people with the surname include:

Jouko Salomäki (born 1962), Finnish wrestler
Miikka Salomäki (born 1993), Finnish ice hockey player
Aki Yli-Salomäki (born 1972), Finnish composer and critic

Finnish-language surnames